Hall of Heroes was an American independent comic book company that existed in the mid-to-late 1990s. Based in Elkhart, Indiana, Hall of Heroes operated from 1993 to 1999.

The company's longest-running titles were two volumes of the anthology Hall of Heroes Presents, which totaled 9 issues; Matt Martin's Vortex (6 issues); and Bog Swamp Demon, which ran 4 issues. (Stephen R. Bissette contributed covers for Bog Swamp Demon.)

Creators associated with Hall of Heroes were Ethan Van Sciver, Keith Alan Morris, Doug Brammer, Trent Kaniuga, Matt Martin, and Andy Brase.

Titles

Bog Swamp Demon by Ryan Brown et al. (4 issues, 1996–1997; later stories published by Image Comics and Numbskull Press)
Creed by Trent Kaniuga (2 issues, 1994–1995; title later acquired by Lightning Comics, then Avatar Press, and then Image Comics)
Cyberfrog by Ethan van Sciver (2 issues; 1994; title later acquired by Harris Publications)
Dragon's Bane: The New Dark Age by Harry Bauer and Sean Murray (3 issues plus 1 ashcan, 1999–2000)
Fuzzy Buzzard! and Friends by Ethan Van Sciver (1 issue, April 1995) 
Hall of Heroes Presents (3 issues, 1993) featuring:
Dead Bolt by Trent Kaniuga
Mourning Star
Nadir
Hall of Heroes Presents (6 issues, 1996–1997) featuring:
The Becoming
Elijah's Fury in the Last Days by Keith Alan Morris
The Fuzz
Power of the Golem by Doug Brammer and Jerry Beck
Salamandroid
Sinnister
Slingers
Turaxx by Andy Brase
Hall of Heroes: Halloween Special (1997)
Hall of Horrors (1 issue, 1997) with stories featuring Grin, Bog, and Sinister.
Sleepwalking (3 issues, 1996–1997)
Snowman (3 issues, 1995–1996) by Matt Martin
Vortex (6 issues, 1993–1995) by Matt Martin

Notes

References

Comic book publishing companies of the United States
Defunct comics and manga publishing companies
1993 establishments in Indiana
Publishing companies established in 1993